GM2 ganglioside activator also known as GM2A is a protein which in humans is encoded by the GM2A gene.

Function 

The protein encoded by this gene is a small glycolipid transport protein which acts as a substrate specific co-factor for the lysosomal enzyme β-hexosaminidase A. β-hexosaminidase A, together with GM2 ganglioside activator, catalyzes the degradation of the ganglioside GM2, and other molecules containing terminal N-acetyl hexosamines.

GM2A is a lipid transfer protein that stimulates the enzymatic processing of gangliosides, and also T-cell  activation through lipid presentation. This protein binds molecules of ganglioside GM2, extracts them from membranes, and presents them to beta-hexosaminidase A for cleavage of N-acetyl-D-galactosamine and conversion to GM3.

It was identified as a member of ML domain family of proteins involved in innate immunity and lipid metabolism in the SMART database. 
.

Regulation 
In melanocytic cells GM2A gene expression may be regulated by MITF.

Clinical significance 

Mutations in this gene, inherited in an autosomal recessive pattern, result in GM2-gangliosidosis, AB variant, a rare GM2 gangliosidosis that has symptoms and pathology identical with Tay–Sachs disease and Sandhoff disease.

GM2A mutations are rarely reported, and the cases that are observed often occur with consanguineous parents or in genetically isolated populations.

Because AB variant is so rarely diagnosed, even in infants, it is likely that most mutations of GM2A are fatal in the fetus in homozygotes and genetic compounds, and thus are never observed clinically.

See also
 Gangliosidosis
 Sandhoff disease
 Tay–Sachs disease
 Hexosaminidase
 GM1

References

Further reading

Cell signaling
Peripheral membrane proteins
Water-soluble transporters